Basistha is a locality situated in south of Guwahati, named after sage Vashistha. Basistha Temple is located in extreme south of locality with hermitage of sage Vashistha popularly known as Bashistha Ashram while Basistha river flows through temple. All major rituals of Hindus are performed here. Basistha ashram's scenic surroundings makes it major picnic spot within the city alongside its religious importance.  National highway 37 passes through Basistha square or chowk which transforms it as transportation hotspot. Basistha square and its nearby areas are major commercial centers.

See also
 Adabari
 Bhetapara
 Ganeshguri
 Kamakhya

References

Neighbourhoods in Guwahati